Paolo Giordano Orsini (1541 – 13 November 1585) was an Italian nobleman, and the first duke of Bracciano from 1560. He was a member of the Roman family of the Orsini.

Biography
The son of Girolamo Orsini and Francesca Sforza, he was grandson, on his father's side, of Felice della Rovere (illegitimate daughter of Pope Julius II) and Gian Giordano Orsini and, on his mother's side, of Count Bosio Sforza and Costanza Farnese, an illegitimate daughter of Pope Paul III.

On 3 September 1558 he married Isabella de' Medici, daughter of Cosimo I de' Medici, Grand Duke of Tuscany, at Poggio a Caiano. Paolo Giordano lived mostly in Rome and his castle at Bracciano, rather than with his wife, who stayed mostly at Florence. In 1571 he took part in the battle of Lepanto. A year later, in October 1572, he served as a general of the Spanish infantry, in a campaign that tried to reclaim the garrison of Navarino in the Peloponnese.

On 16 July 1576 his wife died unexpectedly at the Medici villa of Cerreto Guidi during a hunting holiday. According to her brother, the grand duke Francesco I de' Medici, this occurred "while she was washing her hair in the morning ... She was found by Signor Paolo Giordano on her knees, having immediately fallen dead." This official version of events was not generally believed, and the Ferrarese ambassador, Ercole Cortile, obtained information that Isabella was "strangled at midday" by her husband in the presence of several named servants.

Isabella was the second sudden death in an isolated country villa in the Medici family, her cousin Leonora having died of a similar "accident" only a few days before. Most historians assume that Paolo Giordano killed his wife, in reprisal for carrying on a love affair with his cousin Troilo Orsini, or that he acted on instructions of Isabella's brother, the grand duke. One scholar, Elisabetta Mori, has argued that Isabella de' Medici died of natural causes and that the rumour that Paolo Giordano murdered her was spread by enemies of the Medici.

After these events, Paolo Giordano returned to Rome, where he started a relationship with Vittoria Accoramboni, wife of Francesco Peretti, the nephew of the future Pope Sixtus V. Peretti was assassinated, it was believed by Paolo Giordano's order, in April 1581. Wanted by both the Papal and Florentine police, Paolo Giordano took refuge in northern Italy, first in Venice and then in Abano and Salò with his mistress, whom he married on 20 April 1585. He died at Salò on 13 November 1585.

On 22 December Vittoria was herself assassinated by Ludovico Orsini of the Monterotondo line, on the instigation of Grand Duke Francesco. The Medici (Francesco and Cardinal Ferdinando) wished to secure movable assets in possession of Vittoria for their nephew Virginio Orsini, Paolo Giordano's son from his first marriage and principal heir.

Issue 
By his first wife Isabella de' Medici he had two daughters and a son:
 Francesca Eleonora Orsini (d. 1634). She married Alessandro Sforza, Duke of Segni.
 Isabella Orsini (1571 - 1572).
 Virginio Orsini (1572 - 1615). II Duke of Bracciano.

In fiction
 Paolo Orsini credited as Brachiano is a main character in John Webster's 1612 play The White Devil
 Paolo Orsini credited as Paolo Giordano Orsini is a character in Robert Merle’s 1987 novel ‘’L’Idole’’

Notes

References
Herman, Eleanor (2013): Murder in the Garden of God: A True Story of Renaissance Ambition, Betrayal, and Revenge. Createspace. 
Murphy, Caroline (2008): Isabella de' Medici: The Glorious Life and Tragic End of a Medici Princess. Faber & Faber. 
Mori, Elisabetta (2011): L'onore perduto di Isabella de' Medici. Garzanti.

Further reading
Furlotti, Barbara (2013): A Renaissance Baron and his Possessions. Paolo Giordano I Orsini, Duke of Bracciano (1541-1585), Brepols. 

1541 births
1585 deaths
Paolo Giordano 1
Dukes of Bracciano
16th-century condottieri
16th-century Italian nobility